The Flenser (also known as Flenser Records) is an American record label founded by Jonathan Tuite in 2010 from San Francisco, California. It describes itself as a "dark music" label and a "dark experimental record label".

Notable bands that work with or have worked with The Flenser include Have a Nice Life, Deafheaven, Kayo Dot, Planning for Burial, Midwife, Chat Pile and Uboa. In 2019, The Flenser began publishing literature, with their first full-length novel, To Sing of Damnation, being released in 2020.

History 
The Flenser was founded in 2010 by former musician Jonathan Tuite in San Francisco, who originally intended to focus the label on the American black metal scene at the time. However, the scene began to wane in popularity as The Flenser slowly gained prominence, so Tuite expanded the reach of the label to other genres.

The Flenser's first release was the album The Forgotten by Palace of Worms.

In 2014, the label re-issued Have a Nice Life's debut album Deathconsciousness, which had become a cult classic, and released their second album The Unnatural World.

In March 2019, the label held a two-night showcase in New York City headlined by Have a Nice Life with Planning for Burial, Wreck and Reference, Elizabeth Colour Wheel, Midwife and Consumer. Another two-night event will take place in April 2023 featuring Have a Nice Life, Giles Corey, Midwife, and Planning for Burial.

There was a planned Flenser showcase for the 2020 edition of the Roadburn Festival in the Netherlands to celebrate the tenth anniversary of the label, but it was canceled following the COVID-19 pandemic. It was scheduled to be Giles Corey's debut live performance in Europe.

In 2020, the label released its first novel, To Sing of Damnation by Virginia author Adam Washington.

In March 2022, the label released Send the Pain Below, a six-song EP featuring multiple bands on the label covering nu metal songs.

The label will host a showcase at the Oblivion Access festival in Austin, Texas in June 2023 featuring Have a Nice Life, Chat Pile, Planning for Burial, Mamaleek, Bosse de Nage, Drowse, Sprain, Ragana, and Agriculture.

Artists

Current lineup 

Agriculture
All Your Sisters
Amulets
Black Wing
Boduf Songs
Bosse-de-Nage
Botanist
Chat Pile
Consumer
Cremation Lily
Drowse
Echo Beds
Elizabeth Colour Wheel
Father Murphy
Hand Model
Have a Nice Life
Heinali and Matt Finney
Hissing
Kathryn Mohr
Kayo Dot
King Woman
Low Estate
M. Trecka
Mamaleek
Midwife
Muscle and Marrow
Planning for Burial
RLYR
Sannhet
Scarcity
Sprain
Street Sects
Succumb
Sutekh Hexen
The Flowers of St. Francis
Toby Driver
Trevor de Brauw
Uboa
Vale
Vile Creature
White Suns
Wreck and Reference

Releases

Discography 
 Palace of Worms - "The Forgotten" CD (FR01)
Panopticon - "Collapse" DLP (FR02)
 Bosse-de-Nage - "Bosse-de-Nage" CD (FR03)
Ghast - "May the Curse Bind" DLP (FR04)
 Palace of Worms - "Lifting the Veil" CS (FR05)
Skagos/Panopticon - "Split" CD (FR06)
Necrite - "Sic Transit Gloria Mundi" CD (FR07)
Pale Chalice - "Afflicting the Dichotomy of Trepid Creation" CD (FR08)
Circle of Eyes - "Circle of Eyes" CS (FR09)
Seidr - "For Winter Fire" CD (FR10)
Panopticon - "On the Subject...of Mortality" DLP (FR11)
Bosse-de-Nage - "Bosse-de-Nage (II)" CD/LP (FR12)
Wreck and Reference - "Black Cassette" LP (FR13)
Panopticon - "Social Disservices" CD/DLP (FR14)
Otesanek, Loss, Orthodox, Mournful Congregation - "Fo(u)r Burials" CD (FR15)
Lake of Blood - "As Time And Tide Erodes Stone" LP (FR16)
Lycus - "Demo 2011" LP (FR17)
Wheels within Wheels/Merkaba - "Split" CS (FR18)
Obolus - "Lament" LP (FR19)
Coffinworm - "Great Bringer of Night" LP (FR20)
Worm Ouroboros - "Come the thaw" DLP (FR21)
Nick Millevoi - "In White Sky" CS (FR22)
Wreck and Reference - "No Youth" LP (FR23)
Bosse-de-Nage - "Bosse-de-Nage (III)" DLP (FR24)
Palace of Worms/Mastery - "split" CS (FR25)
Deafheaven/Bosse-de-Nage - "split" LP (FR26)
Grayceon - "Pearl and the End of Days" LP (FR27)
Botanist - "Mandragora" CD/LP (FR28)
Trees - "Sickness-In" LP (FR29)
Bell Witch - "Longing" DLP (FR30)
Vestiges/Panopticon - "split" LP (FR31)
Skagos - "Anarchic" CD (FR32)
Eight Bells - "The Captains Daughter" LP (FR33)
Wreck and Reference - "No Content" 7inch (FR34)
Panopticon - "Kentucky" Reissue DLP (FR35)
Loss Of Self - "Twelve Minutes" CD/LP (FR36)
Botanist/Palace of Worms - "Split" LP (FR37)
Vaura - "The Missing" CD/LP (FR38)
Have a Nice Life - "The Unnatural World" LP (FR39)
White Suns - "Totem" CD/LP (FR40)
Mamaleek - "He Never Spoke a Mumblin' Word" LP (FR41)
Have a Nice Life - "Deathconsciousness" DLP (FR42)
Mastery - "Valis" LP (FR43)
Planning for Burial - "Desideratum" LP/CD (FR44)
Wreck and Reference - "Want" CD/LP (FR45)
Botanist - "VI: Flora" CD/LP (FR46)
Coffinworm - "IV.I.VIII" LP (FR47)
Kayo Dot - "Coffins on Io" CD/LP (FR49)
Boduf Songs - "Stench of Exist" CD/LP (FR50)
King Woman - "Doubt" EP/CS (FR51)
Sannhet - "Revisionist" CD/LP (FR53)
Father Murphy - "Croce" CD/LP/CS (FR54)
Mamaleek - "Via Dolorosa" LP (FR55)
Planning for Burial - "Leaving" LP (FR56)
Bell Witch - "Demo 2011" LP (FR57)
Black Wing - "...Is Doomed" (FR59)
Bosse-de-Nage - "All Fours" LP (FR60)
Heat Dust - "Heat Dust" LP (FR61)
Giles Corey - "Giles Corey" LP (FR62)
Sannhet - "Known Flood" LP (FR63)
Kayo Dot - "Hubardo" CD/LP (FR64)
Trevor De Bruauw - "Uptown" CD (FR65)
Braveyoung - "Misery & Pride" CD/LP (FR66)
Muscle and Marrow - "Love" LP (FR67)
All Your Sisters - "Uncomfortable Skin" LP/CS (FR68)
Kayo Dot - "Plastic House on Base of Sky" CD/LP (FR69)
Wreck and Reference - "Indifferent Rivers Romance End" LP (FR70)
Street Sects - "End Position" LP (FR71)
Planning for Burial - "Matawan - Collected Works 2010-2014" 2CD (FR72)
Toby Driver - "Madonnawhore" CD (FR73)
Succumb - "Succumb" CD/LP (FR74)
Planning for Burial - "Below the House" CD/LP (FR75)
Heinali & Matt Finney - "How We Lived" LP (FR76)
White Suns - "Psychic Drift" CD (FR77)
Mamaleek - "Out Of Time" 2LP (FR79)
Drowse - "Cold Air" LP (FR80)
Street Sects - "Rat Jacket" LP (FR84)
Alis - "The Unraveling" CD/LP (FR85)
RLYR - "Actual Existence" (FR86)
Planning for Burial - "Quietly" CD/LP (FR87)
Bosse-de-Nage - "Further Still" CD/LP (FR90)
All Your Sisters - "Trust Ruins" CD/LP (FR93)
Elizabeth Colour Wheel - "Nocebo" CD/LP (FR94)
Drowse - "Light Mirror" LP (FR95)
Vale - "Burden of Sight" CD (FR96)
Wreck and Reference - "Absolute Still Life" CD/LP (FR98)
Have a Nice Life - "Sea of Worry" CD/LP (FR100)
CONSUMER - "In Computers" LP (FR102)
Midwife - "Forever" LP (FR105)
Planning for Burial - "When Summer Turns to Fall" LP (FR108)
Giles Corey - "Hinterkaifeck" LP (FR109)
The Flowers of St. Francies - "Vol. 5" Tape (FR111)
Midwife & Amulets - "In / Heaven" CS (FR112)
Botanist - "Photosynthesis" LP (FR113)
History - "History" LP (FR114)
Midwife - "Like Author, Like Daughter" LP (FR115)
Black Wing - "No Moon" LP (FR117)
Amulets - "Blooming" LP (FR119)
Midwife - "Luminol" LP (FR120)
Hand Model - "The Thinking Monster" (FR121)
Planning for Burial - "Matwan Collected Works 2010-2014 Vol. 1" LP (FR122)
Succumb - "XXI" LP (FR123)
Various Artists - "Send the Pain Below" LP (FR124)
Mamaleek - "Kurdaitcha" LP (FR126)
Scarcity - "Aveilut" LP (FR127)
Chat Pile - "God's Country" LP (FR129)
Street Sects - "Gentrification V" EP (FR130)
Cremation Lily - "Dreams Drenched in Static" LP (FR131)
Mamaleek - "Diner Coffee" LP (FR132)
Hand Model & Gloved Hands - "Game Changers" Tape (FR133)
Kathryn Mohr - "Holly" Tape, Digital (FR134)
Sister Grotto - "Song for an Unborn Son" LP (FR136)
Planning for Burial - "Matawan 2" LP, Digital (FR137)
Nahvalr - "Nahvalr" LP, Digital (FR138)
Drowse - "Wane into It" LP, Digital (FR140)
Chat Pile - "Tenkiller Motion Picture Soundtrack" Digital (FR141)
Chat Pile - "Tenkiller / Lake Time (Mr. Rodan)" Cassette (FR142)

Literature 

 "Blear" by Bryan Manning (TFB01)
 To Sing of Damnation by Adam Washington (TFB02)
 "Caryatid" by Bryan Manning (TFB04)

See also 
List of record labels
Experimental metal

References

External links 
Official site
Metal Archives
 

American independent record labels
Experimental music record labels
Heavy metal record labels
Record labels established in 2010
Companies based in San Francisco